Kaitlyn Christian and Giuliana Olmos were the defending champions, but Christian chose not to participate. Olmos partnered alongside Kristie Ahn, but lost in the semifinals to Asia Muhammad and Maria Sanchez.

Muhammad and Sanchez went on to win the title, defeating Quinn Gleason and Luisa Stefani in the final, 6–7(4–7), 6–2, [10–8].

Seeds

Draw

Draw

References
Main Draw

Central Coast Pro Tennis Open - Doubles